Fatra is the old or imprecise name of two mountain ranges in Slovakia.

 Veľká Fatra (Greater Fatra), in the Žilina and Banská Bystrica regions
 Malá Fatra (Lesser Fatra), in the Žilina and Trenčín regions

Both ranges belong to the Fatra-Tatra Area, a part of the Inner Western Carpathians.

In Islam, the term fatra refers to the three-year period (610–613) between the first revelation of Muhammad and the start of his ministry.